Leo Kottke is the first album on the Chrysalis label by American guitarist Leo Kottke, released in 1976. It reached #107 on the Billboard Pop Albums charts.

History
After six releases on Capitol, Kottke and his manager/producer Denny Bruce changed labels. This release of all instrumental pieces written by Kottke (with the exception of "Buckaroo") also includes orchestrations by Jack Nitzsche.

The composition "Airproofing" was significantly re-worked and released as "Airproofing II" on Kottke's A Shout Toward Noon. "Death by Reputation" was covered by John Fahey on his album John Fahey Visits Washington D.C..

It was re-issued on CD by BGO in 1996.

Reception

Writing for Allmusic, music critic Chip Renner called the album "Very good guitar playing."

Track listing
All songs by Leo Kottke; except where indicated

Side One
 "Buckaroo" (Bob Morris) – 2:05
 "The White Ape" – 2:13
 "Hayseed Suede" – 2:45
 "Rio Leo" – 2:58
 "Range" – 3:26
 "Airproofing" – 2:19

Side Two
 "Maroon" – 2:02
 "Waltz" – 2:25
 "Death by Reputation" – 4:07
 "Up Tempo" – 1:41
 "Shadowland" – 4:05

Personnel
Leo Kottke - 6 & 12-string guitar
Other artists not credited
Production notes: 
Recorded by Ern Rose at Armstrong Studios, MelbourneScott Rivard and Paul Martinson at Sound 80, MinneapolisDave Hassinger at the Sound Factory West, Los AngelesDouglas Decker at Western Recording, Los Angeles
Re-mix: Scott Rivard, Sound 80
Photographic Collage by John Van Hamersveld
Arrangements by Jack Nitzsche
Produced by Denny Bruce

References

External links
 Leo Kottke's official site
 Unofficial Leo Kottke web site (fan site)

1976 albums
Leo Kottke albums
Chrysalis Records albums
Albums arranged by Jack Nitzsche
Albums produced by Denny Bruce